Seymour is a census-designated place (CDP) and unincorporated community in Blount and Sevier counties in the U.S. state of Tennessee. The CDP population was 14,705 at the 2020 U.S. census. It is included in the Knoxville, Tennessee Metropolitan Statistical Area.

History

Seymour was originally the site of Newell's Station, a frontier station established by early Sevier County pioneer Samuel Newell (1754–1841) in 1783. The first court of Sevier County, State of Franklin, was held at Newell's Station in March 1785. During the 19th century, the community was known as Trundles Crossroads where the main road from Sevierville forked, with one branch continuing northward to Knoxville and one branch westward to Maryville (now the intersection of Boyds Creek Highway and Old Sevierville Pike).

Upon completion of the Knoxville, Sevierville and Eastern Railway on December 18, 1909, the community's station was named Seymour in honor of the line's chief engineer, Charles Seymour. The Trundles Crossroads Post Office changed its name soon after to reflect the community's new designation.

Historical Landmark
The Island View School, located on Boyd’s Creek Highway, is a wooden one room schoolhouse that operated between 1917 and 1949. It held between 35-40 students and covered eight grade levels. The teacher made $50 a month and wore multiple hats: educator, principal, and janitor. The school would shut down during crop season due to the students having to help their families. 

The schoolhouse was restored by Dr. Sam Lyle and John Plummer. Lyle inherited the land from his grandfather. The schoolhouse holds sentimental value to Lyle due to his mother attending the school along with other family members. The family had been using the old schoolhouse to store hay until the building began to decay.

Unsuccessful attempts to incorporate
On multiple occasions, residents have met to discuss the possibility of incorporating as a town or city. The majority of residents have opposed incorporation, arguing it would bring higher taxes and expanded government, while others have argued the community would benefit from a community center, along with sidewalks that might be constructed with the added revenue. Some Blount County residents want their portion of the 37865 zip code to be included within the proposed city limits; however, the incorporation meeting was geared primarily toward the Sevier County portion of the community. In the end, the voters voted overwhelmingly to keep Seymour unincorporated.

Geography
Seymour is located in the northwest corner of Sevier County and northeast corner of Blount County at  (35.870533, -83.775936). The community is situated in a rolling valley where the foothills of the Great Smoky Mountains give way to the Ridge-and-Valley Appalachians. Bluff Mountain, the northern terminus of the Chilhowee Mountain ridge, rises prominently to the south, while the Bays Mountain ridge passes to the north.

Chapman Highway (part of U.S. Route 441) traverses Seymour, connecting the community with Knoxville to the northwest. Near the center of Seymour, Chapman Highway forms a four-way intersection with U.S. Route 411, which approaches from Maryville to the west, and Boyds Creek Highway (State Route 338), which approaches from Boyds Creek to the east. At this intersection, Chapman Highway merges with US 411, and continues eastward to Sevierville.

Demographics

2020 census

As of the 2020 United States census, there were 14,705 people, 4,403 households, and 3,181 families residing in the CDP.

2000 census
As of the census of 2000, there were 8,850 people, 3,431 households, and 2,669 families residing in the CDP. The population density was 700.0 people per square mile (270.3/km2). There were 3,624 housing units at an average density of 286.6/sq mi (110.7/km2). The racial makeup of the CDP was 97.95% White, 0.36% African American, 0.16% Native American, 0.47% Asian, 0.23% from other races, and 0.82% from two or more races. Hispanic or Latino of any race were 0.87% of the population.

There were 3,431 households, out of which 33.5% had children under the age of 18 living with them, 66.2% were married couples living together, 8.9% had a female householder with no husband present, and 22.2% were non-families. 19.0% of all households were made up of individuals, and 6.2% had someone living alone who was aged 65 years or older. The average household size was 2.57 and the average family size was 2.93.

In the CDP, the population was spread out, with 24.3% under the age of 18, 7.8% from 18 to 24, 29.5% from 25 to 44, 26.6% from 45 to 64, and 11.8% who were aged 65 years or older. The median age was 38 years. For every 100 females, there were 95.4 males. For every 100 females age 18 and over, there were 91.3 males.

The median income for a household in the CDP was $40,896, and the median income for a family was $45,244. Males had a median income of $30,568 versus $24,611 for females. The per capita income for the CDP was $18,064. About 3.2% of families and 4.2% of the population were below the poverty line, including 3.5% of those under age 18 and 5.7% of those age 65 or over.

The Seymour Chamber of Commerce contends that the CDP does not include the entire area that is identified as the Seymour community,  which the Chamber estimates to have had a total population of about 13,500 people in 2000.

Education
Private schools in Seymour:
The Kings Academy
Seymour Community Christian School
Public schools in Seymour:
Sevier County Schools
Seymour Primary
Seymour Intermediate
Seymour Junior High
SJHS is a newly created school, contains grade levels 7-9.
Seymour High
Blount County Schools
Prospect Elementary

References

External links
 The Seymour Herald
 Seymour-South Knox Chamber of Commerce
 City-Data Profile of Seymour, TN

Census-designated places in Blount County, Tennessee
Census-designated places in Sevier County, Tennessee
Census-designated places in Tennessee
Knoxville metropolitan area
Communities of the Great Smoky Mountains